Lata Mangeshkar (born Hema Mangeshkar; 28 September 1929 – 6 February 2022) was an Indian legendary playback singer, music producer and music director who made music in Hindi and other Indian languages. Many of her old songs have featured in various new films (Bollywood or Indian films) and have also been credited. But such songs, unless re-recorded, are not enlisted below.

NOTE: This article does not contain all songs sung by Mangeshkar.

Hindi songs

1940s

1945

1946

1947

1948

1949

1950s

1950

1951

1952

1953

1954

1955

1956

1957

1958

1959

1960s

1960

1961

1962

1963

1964

1965

1966

1967

1968

1969

1970s

1970

1971

1972

1973

1974

1975

1976

1977

1978

1979

1980s

1980

1981

1982

1983

1984

1985

1986

1987

1988

1989

1990s

1990

1991

1992

1993

1994

1995

1996

1997

1998

1999

2000s-2020s

2000

2001

2002

2004

2005

2006

2007

2009

Hindi non-film songs

Assamese songs

Bengali songs

Bengali Non-film songs

Gujarati songs

Kannada songs

Malayalam songs

Meitei songs

Nepali songs

1. Akashama Tirmire (written by Late King Mahendra Bir Bikram Shah Dev)
2. Nepali movie maitighar-> jun maatom mero sir jhukos 
3. Bachunjeli (By Ram Krishna Dhakal)

Odia songs

Punjabi songs

Non-film songs

Sinhala songs

Tamil songs

Telugu songs

Bahasa songs

Bhojpuri songs

Sindhi songs

Urdu songs

Maithili songs

Konkani songs 

Bom Jezuchea Konventan
Maria - Mohammed Rafi & Lorna

Tulu songs

Marathi songs

References

External links 
 List of Hindi Songs by Lata Mangeshkar from http://myswar.com
 List of Hindi Songs by Lata Mangeshkar

Mangeshkar, Lata